Griva (Serbian Cyrillic: Грива; trans. Mane) was a Serbian and former Yugoslav hard rock band from Novi Sad.

Band history

1982—1992
The band was formed in 1982 by former Ibn Tup members, Zlatko Karavla (drums) and Josip Sabo (guitar). The first lineup also featured Zoran Gogić (also a former Ibn Tup member, vocals), Laslo Novak (keyboards), and Đorđe Jovanović (bass guitar). Soon after the band was formed, Gogić left the band, so Karavla switched to vocals, and Janoš Kazimić became the band's new drummer.

The band, under the name Bela Griva (White Mane), had their first live performance as the opening act on a Buldožer concert in Novi Sad. Soon after, Griva, as a support act, went on tour with Divlje Jagode. The band's first commercial success was their debut single, a heavy metal cover of Lepa Brena's song "Sitnije, Cile, sitnije" (Griva's version entitled "Sitnije, sestro, sitnije"), released in 1983. The 7-inch single with songs "Sitnije, sestro, sitnije" and "Tebi je važna samo lova" was given as a present with the 751st issue of the comic book magazine Stripoteka. Due to the success of the single, the band signed for Jugoton, and during the same year released their debut album Kog sam đavola tražio u tebi (What the Hell I Saw in You). The album was produced by the radio host Karolj Kovač, and featured Galija frontman Nenad Milosavljević on harmonica. Soon after the album release, Griva became a support band on Divlje Jagode tour once again. On September 24, 1984, Griva performed as the opening band for Motörhead on their concert in Pionir Hall in Belgrade.

New material, recorded in 1985, was refused by several major record labels. It was released, under the title Nisi ni ti anđeo (You're Not an Angel as Well), through an independent label, Panonija Koncert, on compact cassette only. It featured a cover of Joan Jett's version of the song "I Love Rock 'n' Roll", Griva version titled "I law Myroslaw" (the title referring to folk music singer Miroslav Ilić). After the album release Kazimić left the band, and was replaced by Laslo Pihler, a former member of the punk rock band Pekinška Patka. However, Pihler was soon replaced by Nikola Džunja. The release of Nisi ni ti anđeo was not followed by presentation in the media, and after a short Austrian tour, Griva disbanded. In 1986, Karavla and Divlje Jagode frontman Alen Islamović recorded a protest song "Kaljinka", inspired by the Chernobyl disaster.

Soon after Karavla, with various musicians, including former Griva members, Sabo, Jovanović and Novak, recorded a new album, released under the name Griva in 1987. The album, entitled simply Griva, and also known as Vojvodino, Vojvodino, što si tako ravna (Vojvodina, Vojvodina, Why Are You so Flat) after its biggest hit, was released through Jugodisk. The new album, considered the band's biggest commercial success, brought glam metal-oriented songs with elements of folk music of Vojvodina. The album featured a Serbian language cover of Omega's song "Gyöngyhajú lány", Griva version titled "Devojka biserne kose". After the album release, Karavla reunited Griva. The new lineup featured, beside Karavla, Zoran "Bale" Bulatović (a former member of the post-punk/gothic rock band Luna, guitar), Predrag "Buca" Janičić (a former member of the new wave band Kontraritam, drums), Vojislav Vilić (a former member of the hard rock/pop rock band Amajlija, guitar), and Momčilo "Moma" Bajac (a former member of the new wave band Čista Proza, bass guitar). Bulatović and Janičić previously appeared on Griva recording.

In 1988, fourth studio album Što te tata pušta samu (Why Does Your Daddy Let You Go Alone) was released through PGP-RTB. As Bulatović left the band before the album recording, Zoran "Zox" Maletić, a former member of Pekinška Patka, was hired for the album recording. In May Griva performed at the international rock festival in Budapest as one of the headliners. After returning to Yugoslavia, Griva held a concert in Spens Sports Center in Novi Sad with Sing, Sing, Singers, Osmi Putnik, Viktorija and Alen Islamović appearing as the band's special guests. TV Novi Sad produced Griva's TV show, and the band went on their last Yugoslav tour. At the beginning of 1990 the band ended their activity.

In 1991 Karavla started recording the studio album Pij, jedi, veseli se... (Drink, Eat, Be Happy...), the recording of which, due to the outbreak of Yugoslav wars, lasted for more than year and a half. Karavla finished the album recording with various musicians and released it under the Griva moniker in 1992 for the independent label Megaton. Two promotional videos were recorded but there were no live performances, and Griva officially disbanded.

Reunions (2002, 2004)
In September 2002, One Records released the compilation Samo najbolje (Only the Best), and in December the band reunited for an unplugged concert in Studio M in Novi Sad. The recording of the concert was released in 2010 on the live album and the DVD, both entitled Griva & Co. — Live. In 2004 the band reunited to perform at Moto Fest in Novi Sad.

In February 2013, Karavla announced that the band would reunite and release a new studio album, which would be followed by concerts.

Discography

Studio albums
Kog sam đavola tražio u tebi (1983)
Nisi ni ti anđeo (1985)
Griva (1987)
Što te tata pušta samu (1988)
Pij, jedi, veseli se... (1992)

Live albums
Griva & Co. — Live (2010)

Compilations
Samo najbolje (2002)

Video albums
Griva & Co. — Live (2010)

References 

EX YU ROCK enciklopedija 1960–2006, Janjatović Petar; 
NS rockopedija, novosadska rock scena 1963-2003, Mijatović Bogomir; Publisher: SWITCH, 2005

External links
 Zlatko Karavla official site
 Zlatko Karavla official YouTube channel
 Griva at Discogs

 
 

1982 establishments in Yugoslavia
Musical groups established in 1982
Musical groups disestablished in 1992
Musical groups from Novi Sad
Serbian folk rock groups
Serbian hard rock musical groups
Serbian heavy metal musical groups
Yugoslav glam metal musical groups
Yugoslav hard rock musical groups
Yugoslav heavy metal musical groups